John Saunders Chase Jr. (January 23, 1925 – March 29, 2012) was born in Annapolis, Maryland, to John Saunders Chase and Alice Viola Hall. He was an American architect who was the first licensed African American architect in the state of Texas. He was also the only Black architect licensed in the state for almost a decade. He was also the first African American to serve on the U.S. Commission of Fine Arts, which reviewed the design for the United States Vietnam Veterans Memorial.

Chase received Distinguished Alumni Awards from Hampton University (1961) and the University of Texas at Austin (1989 and 1992).

Education and career 
Chase attended Hampton University as an undergrad, graduating in 1948. On June 7, 1950, Chase enrolled in the University of Texas School of Architecture master's program, making the university the first in the South to enroll an African American. Upon graduation, no white firm would hire him, so Chase moved to Houston, Texas to teach at Texas Southern University and to start his own firm, which he owned and operated for over 50 years. Although he had been designing buildings since the late 1940s, Chase started officially practicing architecture in 1952. In 1963, he designed Riverside National Bank, the first black-owned bank in Texas. In 1971, he and 12 other architects founded the National Organization of Minority Architects (NOMA).

Awards 
Over the course of his career, Chase received numerous accolades for his professional and civic achievements.

 Hampton Outstanding Alumnus at Large (1961)
 Houston Citizens' Chamber of Commerce Business Achievement Award (1967)
 Omega Psi Phi Fraternity, Inc. Man of the Year (1968)
 Service to Humanity Award (1972)
 Houston Association of General and SubContractors Award (1974)
 Black Entrepreneur Award from National Association of Black Accountants (1977)
 Central Intercollegiate Athletic Association (CIAA) Hall of Fame for Wrestling and Football (1977)
 AIA Whitney M. Young Jr. Citation for Significant Contributions to Social Responsibility (1982)
 NOMA Design for Excellence Award (1984-1987)
 Distinguished Black Alumnus Award (1989)
 Texas Ex-Students Association Distinguished Alumnus Award (1992)
 Commendation for Meritorious Service Houston ISD
 Honor Award for Architectural Excellence in School Design, Texas Association of School Boards (for Booker T. Washington High School)
 City of Annapolis Outstanding Contributions in the Field of Architecture
 Fleet Owners Golden 100 Award
 Texas Society of Architects Honor Award

Selected works 

 Deluxe Hotel, Austin, 1949-1953
Colored Teachers State Association of Texas Headquarters, Austin, 1952
Greater Mt. Zion Baptist Church, Houston, 1955 (with David C. Baer)
David Chapel Missionary Baptist Church, Austin, 1959
Chase Residence, Houston, 1959
Olivet Baptist Church, Austin, 1961
Irene Thompson House, Austin, 1963
Riverside National Bank, Houston, 1963
Della Philips House, Austin, 1966
Martin Luther King Jr. Humanities Building at Texas Southern University, Houston, 1969
Greater Barbours Chapel Missionary Baptist Church, Texas City, 1971
Washington Technical Institute, Washington, DC, 1972, 1976-1979
Atlanta Life Building, Atlanta, 1974-1975
Ernest S. Sterling Student Life Center at Texas Southern University, Houston, 1976
Thurgood Marshall School of Law at Texas Southern University, Houston, 1976
Booker T. Washington High School, Houston, 1984-1986 (with Morris Architects)
Links, Inc., National Headquarters, Washington, DC, 1985
George R. Brown Convention Center (Banquet Halls and Grand Ballroom, with Golemon & Rolfe Associates, Molina & Associates, Haywood Jordan McGowan, Moseley Associations, and 3D/International)), Houston, 1988
Harris County Astrodome Remodeling and Expansion Project (with CRS Sirrine, Wilson/Griffin, and Haywood Jordan McCowan), 1989/1990
Delta Sigma Theta, Sorority, Inc. National Headquarters, Washington DC, 1990
School of Law & Government Studies, Townview Center Magnet High School, Dallas, 1991-1995
U.S. Embassy, Tunis, Tunisia, 1992-1995 (never built)
San Antonio Garage, University of Texas at Austin, 1993-1994 (with Morris Architects)
Mike A. Myers Track and Soccer Stadium, University of Texas at Austin, 1999-2000
Toyota Center (associate architect with HOK Sport and Morris Architects), Houston, 2003

References

External links 

 Interview with John S. Chase: President of UT Austin's Ex-Students Association, 1999-11-01, In Black America; KUT Radio, American Archive of Public Broadcasting (WGBH and the Library of Congress)

1925 births
2012 deaths
Architects from Maryland
Architects from Texas
African-American architects
20th-century American architects
University of Texas at Austin School of Architecture alumni
20th-century African-American artists
21st-century African-American people